is a Japanese football referee. He has refereed in the Japanese J. League Division 1 since 1999 and has been a full international referee for FIFA since 2004. He refereed the opening game in the 2014 FIFA World Cup between hosts Brazil and Croatia, and also the second leg of the 2014 AFC Champions League final between Al Hilal and Sydney FC. His poor refereeing performance in the former of the matches have led people to criticize him.

Career
Nishimura was the only Asian referee selected to officiate at the 2008 African Cup of Nations in Ghana along with assistant referees Toru Sagara from Japan and Jeong Hae-Sang from South Korea.

Nishimura refereed the final of the 2010 FIFA Club World Cup between Inter Milan and TP Mazembe.

On 13 November 2010, Nishimura was the referee for the final match of the 2010 AFC Champions League Final, Seongnam Ilhwa Chunma vs. Zob Ahan, at the National Stadium in Tokyo.

Nishimura officiated at the 2007 and 2011 Asian Cups.

At the 2012 Men's Olympic Football Tournament, Nishimura officiated the group stage matches between Brazil and Belarus and host Great Britain and Uruguay.

Nishimura was appointed to the second leg of the 2014 AFC Champions League Final in which Al-Hilal FC faced Western Sydney Wanderers FC. The match ended in a 0–0 upset, which saw the Western Sydney Wanderers crowned AFC champions courtesy of their 1–0 victory in the first leg. However, he gained heavy criticism over his mistakes. Which, some say, stripped Al Hilal from the cup.

2010 FIFA World Cup
Nishimura was preselected as a referee for the 2010 FIFA World Cup.  He was the referee for the Uruguay against France game at the 2010 FIFA World Cup, along with fourth official Joel Aguilar and assistant referees Jeong Hae-Sang, and Toru Sagara. Nishimura produced the first red card of the tournament, when he sent Uruguay midfielder Nicolás Lodeiro off the field for two yellow cards. During the first quarter-final game between Brazil and the Netherlands at Nelson Mandela Bay Stadium in Port Elizabeth, Nishimura sent off Felipe Melo of Brazil in the 73rd minute of the game. He was the 4th official for the final match of the World Cup, Netherlands vs. Spain.

2014 FIFA World Cup

Nishimura was chosen by FIFA to referee the opening game of the 2014 FIFA World Cup between Brazil and Croatia. With this, he became only the third Japanese referee to officiate at two FIFA World Cups, after Shizuo Takada and Toru Kamikawa. In the match, Nishimura became the first referee to use vanishing spray at a World Cup finals, as well as to have access to goal-line technology. The game ended with a 3–1 victory for hosts Brazil. Despite significant criticism, Nishimura was appointed to two other games in the tournament as the fourth official: the Group E match between Honduras and Ecuador (2–1 win for Ecuador), and the third place play-off match between Brazil and the Netherlands (3–0 win for the Netherlands).

2014 AFC Champions League
He officiated the second leg of the 2014 AFC Champions League Final between Al Hilal FC and Western Sydney Wanderers FC, the match ended 0–0 but the Wanderers won the championship as they had scored a goal in the first leg in Parramatta.

Awards
Nishimura was chosen as the J. League Referee of the Year in 2009 and 2010. In 2012, he was named Best Men's Referee of the Year by the Asian Football Confederation.

References

External links

FIFA profile (2007 U-17 World Cup) 
Professional Referees, Japan Football Association
Video interview at the AFC Annual Awards
Yuichi Nishimura at worldreferee.com

1972 births
Living people
Japanese football referees
Association football people from Tokyo
2010 FIFA World Cup referees
Olympic football referees
Football referees at the 2012 Summer Olympics
2014 FIFA World Cup referees
FIFA World Cup referees
AFC Asian Cup referees